The Kia KM450, designated as the K311 by the Republic of Korea Armed Forces, or known as 1¼ truck, is a South Korean light military truck introduced in 1981. It is a modern license-produced version of the American Kaiser Jeep M715 truck.

Variants

 KM450 Cargo Truck
 KM451 Ambulance
 KM452 Shop Van
 KM454 Shelter Cargo

Operators

 Donated by South Korea in 2017.

 Used by Chilean Marine Corps.

 Assembled locally by Korean-Malian joint company Wad Youngsan Industries S.A. in Banankoro.

 Operates at least 100 vehicles as of 2023.

 157 vehicles donated by South Korea in 2010. Philippines received a total of 1,400 vehicles as of 2020.

 To be produced locally by Telecard-Pribor to replace R-125.

References

Military trucks of South Korea